IFACnet, the KnowledgeNet for Professional Accountants, was the global, multilingual search engine developed by the International Federation of Accountants (IFAC) and its members to provide professional accountants worldwide with one-stop access to good practice guidance, articles, management tools and other resources. This enterprise search engine was launched on October 2, 2006, by INDEZ. Originally marketed to professional accountants in business, IFACnet was expanded in March 2007 to provide resources and information relevant to small and medium accounting practices. In 2014, IFACnet was expanded and replaced by IFAC Knowledge Gateway, providing thought leadership and resources from IFAC and across the accountancy profession.

The following 31 organizations participated in the original IFACnet:

American Institute of Certified Public Accountants (AICPA)
Association of Chartered Certified Accountants (ACCA)
Canadian Institute of Chartered Accountants
Certified General Accountants Association of Canada
Chartered Institute of Management Accountants (CIMA)
Chartered Institute of Public Finance and Accountancy
CMA Canada
Compagnie Nationale des Commissaires aux Comptes
Conseil Supérieur de l'Ordre des Experts-Comptables
Consiglio Nazionale Dottori Commercialisti
CPA Australia
Délégation Internationale Pour l'Audit et la Comptabilité
Hong Kong Institute of Certified Public Accountants (HKICPA)
International Federation of Accountants  (IFAC)
Institut der Wirtschaftspruefer in Deutschland e.V. (IDW)
Institute of Certified Public Accountants in Ireland
Institute of Certified Public Accountants of Singapore
Institute of Chartered Accountants of Australia
Institute of Chartered Accountants in England & Wales (ICAEW)
Institute of Chartered Accountants in Ireland
Institute of Chartered Accountants of India
Institute of Chartered Accountants of Pakistan
Institute of Chartered Accountants of Scotland (ICAS)
Institute of Management Accountants
Japanese Institute of Certified Public Accountants (JICPA)
Koninklijk Nederlands Instituut van Registeraccountants (Royal NIVRA)
Malaysian Institute of Accountants
Malta Institute of Accountants
National Association of State Boards of Accountancy (NASBA)
South African Institute of Chartered Accountants (SAICA)
Union of Chambers of Certified Public Accountants of Turkey (TÜRMOB)

External links
IFAC's Knowledge Gateway
International Federation of Accountants Homepage

Information retrieval organizations
Internet search engines
Accounting organizations